Herman Alexander Hill (October 12, 1945 – December 14, 1970) was an American professional baseball player, an outfielder who appeared in 43 Major League games for the – Minnesota Twins. Hill drowned in the Caribbean Sea off the coast of Venezuela during the 1970 winter baseball season.

Born to Charles and Milobelia Hill in Tuskegee, Alabama, Hill was one of 15 children. He grew up in Farmingdale, New Jersey, and graduated from Southern Freehold High School (since renamed as Howell High School).

Scouted by future major league manager and executive Jack McKeon, he signed with the Twins in 1966 and rose through their farm system. Hill was described in March 1969 by Baseball Digest as a "Good prospect. Has hustle, desire, determination. Speedy baserunner and hits with power." After batting .300 with 31 stolen bases in 1969 for the Denver Bears of the Triple-A American Association, Hill was recalled that September. He served as a pinch runner in his first 11 MLB appearances before Twins' manager Billy Martin used him as a pinch hitter and backup centerfielder. He went hitless in two at bats and scored four runs.

In 1970, he split the season between the Triple-A Evansville Triplets and Minnesota, appearing in 27 MLB games in June, July and September. On June 29 at Metropolitan Stadium, Hill started in centerfield and collected his first two Major League hits, both singles off Dick Drago of the Kansas City Royals. Hill also scored two runs in a 5–4 Minnesota victory. Hill started again the next day, but was hitless in five at bats and the remainder of his MLB career was a pinch runner, pinch hitter or late-inning defensive replacement.  During his Minnesota career, Hill batted 24 times with two hits (both on June 29, 1970), no runs batted in, one stolen base and two caught stealings. He scored 12 runs.

After being traded to the St. Louis Cardinals in October 1970, Hill played winter baseball in Venezuela. He drowned while swimming near Puerto Cabello at age 25.

See also
 List of baseball players who died during their careers

References

External links

Pura Pelota (Venezuelan Winter League)

1945 births
1970 deaths
20th-century African-American sportspeople
Accidental deaths in Venezuela
African-American baseball players
Baseball players from New Jersey
Charlotte Hornets (baseball) players
Deaths by drowning
Denver Bears players
Evansville Triplets players
Florida Instructional League Twins players
Gulf Coast Twins players
Howell High School (New Jersey) alumni
Major League Baseball center fielders
Minnesota Twins players
Navegantes del Magallanes players
American expatriate baseball players in Venezuela
Orlando Twins players
People from Farmingdale, New Jersey
Sportspeople from Tuskegee, Alabama
Sportspeople from Monmouth County, New Jersey
Wilson Tobs players